The Alliance for Democracy and Progress (ADP) is a political party in the Central African Republic.

History
The party was established in October 1991. It won six seats in the National Assembly in the 1993 general elections, and joined Jean-Luc Mandaba's coalition government.

In the next parliamentary elections in 1998 the ADP was part of the Union of Forces for Peace (UFAP), which opposed President Ange-Félix Patassé. The ADP won five seats, and UFAP gained a majority of 55 of the 109 seats in the National Assembly. However, the ruling Movement for the Liberation of the Central African People was able to form a government after the defection of a UFAP MP.

The 2005 general elections saw the ADP win two seats, whilst its presidential candidate Olivier Gabirault finished last in a field of 11 candidates with 0.6% of the vote. The party put forward nine candidates for the National Assembly in the 2011 general elections, but failed to win a seat.

References

1991 establishments in the Central African Republic
Political parties established in 1991
Political parties in the Central African Republic